Animated Violence Mild is the fourth studio album by British electronic musician Blanck Mass. It was released on 16 August 2019 under Sacred Bones Records.

The album's title is likely a reference to a disclaimer sticker applied to certain arcade cabinets by the American Amusement Machine Association.

Accolades

Critical reception
Animated Violence Mild was met with generally favourable reviews from critics. At Metacritic, which assigns a weighted average rating out of 100 to reviews from mainstream publications, this release received an average score of 80, based on 20 reviews.

Track listing

Charts

References

2019 albums
Blanck Mass albums
Sacred Bones Records albums